Plumbylenes (or plumbylidenes) are divalent organolead(II) analogues of carbenes, with the general chemical formula, R2Pb, where R denotes a substituent. Plumbylenes possess 6 electrons in their valence shell, and are considered open shell species.

The first plumbylene reported was the dialkylplumbylene, [(Me3Si)2CH]2Pb, which was synthesized by Michael F. Lappert et al in 1973.

Plumbylenes may be further classified into carbon-substituted plumbylenes, plumbylenes stabilized by a group 15 or 16 element, and monohalogenated plumbylenes (RPbX).

Synthesis 
Plumbylenes can generally be synthesized via the transmetallation of PbX2 (where X denotes halogen) with an organolithium (RLi) or Grignard reagent (RMgX). The first reported plumbylene, [((CH3)3Si)2CH]2Pb, was synthesized by Michael F. Lappert et al by transmetallation of PbCl2 with [((CH3)3Si)2CH]Li. The addition of equimolar RLi to PbX2 produces the monohalogenated plumbylene (RPbX); addition of 2 equivalents leads to disubstituted plumbylene (R2Pb). Adding an organolithium or Grignard reagent with a different organic substituent (i.e. R’Li/R’MgX) from RPbX leads to the synthesis of heteroleptic plumbylenes (RR’Pb). Dialkyl-, diaryl-, diamido-, dithioplumbylenes, and monohalogenated plumbyelenes have been successfully synthesized this way.

Transmetallation with [((CH3)3Si)2N]2Pb as the Pb(II) precursor has also been used to synthesize diarylplumbylenes, disilylplumbylenes, and saturated N-heterocyclic plumbylenes.

Alternatively, plumbylenes may be synthesized from the reductive dehalogenation of tetravalent organolead compounds (R2PbX2).

Structure and bonding 

The key aspects of bonding and reactivity in plumbylenes are dictated by the inert pair effect, whereby the combination of a widening s–p orbital energy gap as a trend down the group 14 elements and a strong relativistic contraction of the 6s orbital lead to a limited degree of sp hybridization and the 6s orbital being deep in energy and inert. Consequently, plumbylenes exclusively have a singlet spin state due to the large singlet–triplet energy gap, and tend to exist in an equilibrium between monomeric and dimeric forms in solution. This is in contrast to carbenes, which often have a triplet ground state and readily dimerize to form alkenes.

In dimethyllead, (CH3)2Pb, the Pb–C bond length is 2.267 Å and the C–Pb–C bond angle is 93.02°; the singlet–triplet gap is 36.99 kcal mol−1.

Diphenyllead, (C6H5)2Pb was computed with GAMESS at the B3PW91 level of theory using the basis sets 6-311+G(2df,p) for C and H and def2-svp for Pb with the ECP60MDF pseudopotential, in an adapted procedure (which uses the cc-pVTZ basis set for Pb instead). The molecular orbitals (MOs) (visualized using Chimera) and natural bond orbitals (NBOs) (visualized using multiwfn) generated are produced below, and qualitatively identical to the literature. As expected, the HOMO is 6s-dominated, and the LUMO is 6p-dominated. The NBOs are of the 6s lone pair and vacant 6p orbital respectively.

The Pb–C bond distance was found to be 2.303 Å and the C–Pb–C angle 105.7°. Notwithstanding the different levels of theory, the larger bond angle for (C6H5)2Pb compared to  can be rationalized by the greater repulsion between the sterically bulkier phenyl groups relative to methyl groups.

Atoms in molecules (AIM) topology analysis revealed critical points in (C6H5)2Pb, and is consistent with the literature.

Plumbylenes occur as reactive intermediates in the formation of tetravalent plumbanes (R4Pb). Although the inert pair effect suggests the divalent state should be thermodynamically more stable than the tetravalent state, in the absence of stabilizing substituents, plumbylenes are sensitive to heat and light, and tend to undergo polymerization and disproportionation, forming elemental lead in the process.

Plumbylenes can be stabilized as monomers by the use of sterically bulky ligands (kinetic stabilization) or heteroatom-containing substituents that can donate electron density into the vacant 6p orbital (thermodynamic stabilization).

Dimerization 

Plumbylenes are able to undergo dimerization in two ways: either through the formation of a Pb=Pb double bond to form a formal diplumbene, or through bridging halide interactions. Unhalogenated plumbylenes tend to exist in an equilibrium between the monomeric and dimeric form in solution, and, due to the low dimerization energy, as either monomers or dimers in the solid state, depending on the steric bulk of substituents. However, increasing the steric bulk of lead-bound substituents can prevent the close association of plumbylene molecules and allow the plumbylene to exist exclusively as monomers in solution or even in the solid state.

The driving force for dimerization in general arises from the Lewis amphoteric nature of plumbylenes, which possess a Lewis acidic vacant 6p orbital and a weakly Lewis basic 6s lone pair, which can act as electron acceptor and donor orbitals respectively.
These diplumbenes possess a trans-bent structure similar to that in lighter, non-carbon congeners (disilenes, digermylenes, distannylenes). The observed Pb–Pb bond lengths in diplumbenes (2.90 – 3.53 Å) have been found to typically be longer than those in tetravalent diplumbanes R3PbPbR3 (2.84 – 2.97 Å). This, together with the low computed dimerization energy (energy released from the formation of dimers from monomers) of 24 kJ mol−1 for Pb2H4, indicates weak multiple bonding. This counterintuitive result is due to the pair of 6s-6p donor-acceptor interactions representing the Pb=Pb double bond in diplumbenes being less energetically favourable compared to the overlap of spn orbitals (with a higher degree of hybridization than in diplumbenes) in the Pb–Pb single bond in diplumbanes.

In monohalogenated plumbylenes, the halogen atom on one plumbylene is able to donate a lone pair into the vacant 6p orbital of the lead atom on a separate plumbylene in a bridging mode. Monohalogenated plumbylenes have been found to generally exist as monomers in solution and dimers in the solid state, but, again, sufficiently bulky substituents on lead can sterically block this dimerization mode.

Due to decreasing dimerization energy down Group 14, while monohalogenated stannylenes and plumbylenes dimerize via the halogen-bridging mode, monohalogenated silylenes and germylenes tend to dimerize via the abovementioned multiply-bonded mode instead.

In a recent study, an N-heterocyclic plumbylene was shown to undergo dimerization leading to C–H activation, existing in solution in an equilibrium between the monomer and a dimer resulting from cleavage of an aryl C–H bond and formation of Pb–C and N–H bonds. DFT studies proposed that the reaction occurred via electrophilic substitution at the arene of one plumbylene by the lead atom of another, and involves concerted Pb–C and N–H bond formation instead of insertion of Pb into the C–H bond.

Stabilizing intramolecular interactions with substituents bearing lone pairs 
Plumbylenes may be stabilized by electron donation into the vacant orbital of the lead atom. The two common intramolecular modes are resonance from a lone pair on the atom directly attached to the lead or by coordination from a Lewis base elsewhere in the molecule.

For example, Group 15 or 16 elements directly adjacent to Pb donate a lone pair in manner similar to their stabilizing effect on Fisher carbenes. Common examples of more remote electron-donors include nitrogen atoms that can lead to a six-memberd ring by bonding to the lead. Even a fluorine atom on a remote trifluoromethyl group has been seen forming a coordination to lead in [2,4,6-(CF3)3C6H2]2Pb.

Agostic interactions 
Agostic interactions have also been shown to stabilize plumbylenes. DFT computations on the compounds [(R(CH3)2Si){(CH3)2P(BH3)}CH]2Pb (R = Me or Ph) found that agostic interactions between bonding B–H orbitals and the vacant 6p orbital lowered the energy of the molecule by ca. 38 kcal mol−1; this was supported by X-ray crystal structures showing the favourable positioning of said B–H bonds in proximity of Pb.

Reactivity 
As previously mentioned, unstabilized plumbylenes are prone to polymerization and disproportionation, and plumbylenes without bulky substituents tend to dimerize in one of two modes. Below, the reactions of stabilized plumbylenes (at least at the temperatures at which they were studied) are listed.

Lewis acid-base adduct formation 
Plumbylenes are Lewis acidic via the vacant 6p orbital and tend to form adducts with Lewis bases, such as trimethylamine N-oxide (Me3NO), 1-azidoadamantane (AdN3), and mesityl azide (MesN3). In contrast, the reaction between stannylenes and Me3NO produces the corresponding distannoxane (from oxidation of Sn(II) to Sn(IV)) instead of the Lewis adduct, which can be attributed to tin being a period above Pb, experiencing the inert pair effect to a lesser degree and hence having a higher susceptibility to oxidation.

In the case of AdN3, the terminal N of the azidoadamantane binds to the plumbylene via a bridging mode between the Lewis acidic Pb and the Lewis basic P atom; in the case of MesN3, the azide evolves N2 to form a nitrene, which then inserts into a C-H bond of an arene substituent and coordinates to Pb as a Lewis base.

Insertion 
Similar to carbenes and other Group 14 congeners, plumbylenes have been shown to undergo insertion reactions, specifically into C–X (X = Br, I) and Group 16 E–E (E = S, Se) bonds. 

Insertions into lead-substituent bonds can also occur.27 In the examples below, insertion is accompanied by intramolecular rearrangement to place more electron-donating heteroatoms next to the electron-deficient lead.27

Transmetallation 
Plumbylenes are known to undergo nucleophilic substitution with organometallic reagents to form transmetallated products.28 In an unusual example, the use of TlPF6, bearing the weakly coordinating anion PF6−, led to the formation of crystals of an oligonuclear lead compound with a chain structure upon work-up, highlighting the interesting reactivity of plumbylenes.28

In addition, plumbylenes can also undergo metathesis with group 13 E(CH3)3 (E = Al, Ga) compounds.

Plumbylenes bearing different substituents can also undergo transmetallation and exchange substituents, with the driving force being the relief of steric strain and the low Pb-C bond dissociation energy.

Applications 

Plumbylenes can be used as concurrent σ-donor-σ-acceptor ligands to metal complexes, functioning as σ-donor via its filled 6s orbital and σ-acceptor via its empty 6p orbital.

Room temperature-stable plumbylenes have also been suggested as precursors in chemical vapour deposition (CVD) and atomic layer deposition (ALD) of lead-containing materials. Dithioplumbylenes and dialkoxyplumbylenes may be useful as precursors for preparing the semiconductor material lead sulphide and piezoelectric PZT respectively.

References 

Organolead compounds